David Anthony Watt (born 5 November 1946) is a British computer scientist.

Watt is a professor at the University of Glasgow, Scotland. With Peter Mosses he developed action semantics, a combination of denotational semantics, operational and algebraic semantics. He currently teaches a third year programming languages course, and a postgraduate course on algorithms and data structures. He is recognisable around campus for his more formal attire compared to the department's normally casual dress code.

References

External links 
 Home page

1946 births
Living people
British computer scientists
Academics of the University of Glasgow
Formal methods people
Place of birth missing (living people)